is a festival held in Doi, Shikokuchūō, Ehime, Japan every year from the 13th to the 15th of October. It is dedicated to wishing for a good harvest.

Local shrine and taikodai 
Sekigawa District
 Sensoku jinja (千足神社): Hongō (本郷) taikodai
 Sensoku jinja: Izumi (泉) taikodai
 Sensoku jinja: Uchinokawa (内之川) taikodai
 Sensoku jinja: Seki (関) taikodai
 Sensoku jinja: Kinokawa (木之川) taikodai
 Tenma jinja: Kitano (北野) taikodai
Doi District
 Doi jinja (土居神社): Irino (入野) taikodai
 Doi jinja: Hatano (畑野) taikodai
 Yagumo jinja (八雲神社): Doihongō (土居本郷) taikodai
 Idaki jinja (伊太祁神社): Idake (飯武) taikodai
Kita District
 Yagumo jinja (八雲神社): Kamitenma (上天満) taikodai
 Yagumo jinja: Higashitenma (東天満) taikodai
 Tenma jinja (天満神社): Shimotenma (下天満) taikodai
 Kaburasaki jinja (蕪崎神社): Kaburasaki (蕪崎) taikodi
Nakamura District
 Imori jinja (井守神社): Nakamura (中村) taikodai
Tobu District
 Mishima jinja (三島神社): Kobayashi (小林) taikodai
 Ichimiya jinja (一宮神社): Yōkaichi (八日市) taikodai
 Murayama jinja (村山神社): Tsune (津根) taikodai
 Hachimandai jinja (八幡大神社): Kamiichi gosen (上市御船)

Festivals in Japan
Annual events in Japan
Tourist attractions in Ehime Prefecture
October events